Atossa Araxia Abrahamian is a New York-based journalist and a senior editor of The Nation. Abrahamian is also the author of the 2015 non-fiction book The Cosmopolites: The Coming of the Global Citizen.

Life and career
Abrahamian was born in Canada and grew up in Switzerland. Her parents, who are Iranians of Armenian and Russian descent, worked for the United Nations. She holds Swiss, Canadian and Iranian citizenship and speaks English, French, and Russian.

Abrahamian is an alumna of the International School of Geneva. She earned an undergraduate degree in philosophy from Columbia College in 2008. She then earned her master's degree at the Columbia University Graduate School of Journalism.

She began her career as a business journalist for Thomson Reuters. Abrahamian later served as editor for the magazine The New Inquiry and Dissent. She also worked as an opinion editor for Al Jazeera America. In 2018, she was named a senior editor of The Nation.

References

1986 births
Living people
The Nation (U.S. magazine) people
Swiss women journalists
Swiss expatriates in the United States
Swiss people of Russian descent
Swiss people of Armenian descent
21st-century American journalists
21st-century Swiss journalists
21st-century Swiss women writers
Columbia College (New York) alumni
Columbia University Graduate School of Journalism alumni
Canadian emigrants to Switzerland
International School of Geneva alumni
Journalists from British Columbia
Women magazine editors
Writers from Vancouver
Thomson Reuters people
Swiss people of Iranian descent
Canadian people of Iranian descent
Canadian people of Armenian descent
Swiss people of Canadian descent
Canadian expatriates in Switzerland